Jan "Janne" Harry Halldoff (4 September 1939 – 23 July 2010) was a Swedish film director and screenwriter. He directed 17 films between 1966 and 1982.

His 1967 film titled Life's Just Great was entered into the 17th Berlin International Film Festival. His 1968 film titled The Corridor was entered into the 6th Moscow International Film Festival. His 1974 film The Last Adventure won the award for Best Film at the 11th Guldbagge Awards. His 1976 film Buddies won the award for Best Director at the 12th Guldbagge Awards.

Selected filmography
 Life's Just Great (1967)
 The Corridor (1968)
 Rötmånad (1970)
 The Last Adventure (1974)
 Buddies (1976)
 Father to Be (1979)

References

External links

1939 births
2010 deaths
Swedish film directors
Swedish screenwriters
Swedish male screenwriters
Writers from Stockholm
Best Director Guldbagge Award winners
20th-century Swedish people